William Thorne may refer to:

William Thorne (chronicler) (fl. 1397), English Benedictine monk
William Thorne (orientalist) (1568?–1630), English Hebraist
William Thorne (mayor of Brisbane), mayor of Brisbane, Queensland, Australia, 1898
William Thorne (mayor of Cape Town) (1839–1917), mayor of Cape Town (1901–1904)
William Henry Thorne (1844–1923), Canadian Senator for New Brunswick (1913–1923)
William P. Thorne (1845–1928), Lieutenant Governor of Kentucky (1903–1907)
William Thorne (philatelist) (1845–1907), American businessman and philatelist
Will Thorne (1857–1946), Member of the British Parliament
William V.S. Thorne (1865–1920), American tennis player
William L. Thorne (1878–1948), American film actor
William A. Thorne Jr., judge of the Utah Court of Appeals (2000–present)
Willie Thorne (1954–2020), English snooker player